Huntleys Cove is a suburb on the Lower North Shore of Sydney, in the state of New South Wales, Australia. Huntleys Cove is located 9 kilometres north-west of the Sydney central business district, in the local government area of the Municipality of Hunter's Hill. Huntleys Cove sits on the peninsula between Tarban Creek and the Parramatta River.

History
Huntleys Cove was originally part of the suburb of Gladesville and a site of part of the Gladesville Mental Hospital. When it became a separate suburb it was known as Tarban, taking its name from Tarban Creek. This was changed to Huntleys Cove in 2002 after residents voted on the issue.

Population
At the 2016 census, there were 800 residents in Huntleys Cove. The median age of residents was 50 and people aged 65 years and over made up 29.9% of the population. 63.6% of people were born in Australia and 78.2% of people spoke only English at home. The most common ancestries were English, Australian and Irish. The most common responses for religion were Catholic 35.1%, No Religion 21.4% and Anglican 14.8%. The median household weekly income was quite high at $2,071.

Landmarks
Tarban Creek is a Lower North Shore estuary of great importance to Sydney Harbour, the Parramatta River and the Ryde-Hunters Hill waterways & stormwater systems. Tarban Creek Bridge links Huntleys Point north to Hunters Hill.

The UNSW Rowing Club has maintained a boatshed and pontoon at Huntley's Cove since 1966. Since 2009 the club has also shared a second modern boathouse and clubrooms with the rowing club of the Sydney Girls High School situated close to the southern underspan of the Tarban Creek bridge.

References
The Book of Sydney Suburbs, Compiled by Frances Pollen, Angus & Robertson Publishers, 1990, Published in Australia

External links
Discover Hunters Hill

Suburbs of Sydney
Municipality of Hunter's Hill